Nepeña is a town and the capital of Nepeña District, in the province Santa in Peru.

References 

Populated places in the Ancash Region